Springs is an unincorporated community in Elk Lick Township, Somerset County, Pennsylvania, United States.  Springs is known for its Spring Folk Festival, which takes place annually in October, its museum and its farmers' market. It is part of the Johnstown, Pennsylvania Metropolitan Statistical Area.

External links

Springs Historical Society

Unincorporated communities in Somerset County, Pennsylvania
Unincorporated communities in Pennsylvania